Hubertus Maria Franciscus "Hubert" Bruls (born 6 February 1966) is a Dutch politician who has served as Mayor of Nijmegen since 2012. A member of the Christian Democratic Appeal (CDA), he has also served as chairman of the Dutch Security Council since 2016.

Early life 
Bruls attended the former Bisschoppelijk College in Sittard – a gymnasium, the highest level of Dutch secondary education. He then studied political science at Radboud University Nijmegen, before working for the trade union NOVON/ABVAKABO. From 1998, he served as a member of the municipal council of Nijmegen and later an alderman in its municipal executive.

Career 

Bruls has held the mayorship of Nijmegen since 2012, with the city's municipal council approving a second six-year term in 2018. He is also ex officio chairman of the South Gelderland safety region, as well as, since 2016, chairman of the Security Council (Veiligheidsberaad), which encompasses the 25 Dutch safety regions.

In this last role he has been the main liaison between the Minister of Health and the safety regions during the COVID-19 pandemic. He currently also serves as deputy chairman of the Association of Netherlands Municipalities (VNG) under the leadership of chairman and The Hague Mayor Jan van Zanen. Before becoming Mayor of Nijmegen Bruls was a member of the House of Representatives (2002–2005) and Mayor of Venlo (2005–2012).

Personal life 
Bruls is married and has two daughters.

Notes and references

Notes

References

External links 
  Parliament.com biography

1966 births
Living people
Members of the House of Representatives (Netherlands)
Christian Democratic Appeal politicians
Mayors of Venlo
Mayors of Nijmegen
Municipal councillors of Nijmegen
Aldermen in Gelderland
People from Nuth
Radboud University Nijmegen alumni